This is list of archives in the Czech Republic.

Archives in the Czech Republic 

 National Archives (Czech Republic)
 Archive of the National Museum (Prague)
 State Regional Archive in Trebon
 State Regional Archive in Litomerice
 State Regional Archive in Prague
 Moravian Land Archive, Brno
 Land Archive, Opava
 Land Archive, Olomouc
 Prague's Castle Archive
 Charles University Archives
 Prague City Archives
 Brno City Archive
 Ostrava City Archive
 Plzen City Archive
 Usti nad Labem City Archive

See also 

 List of archives
 List of museums in the Czech Republic
 Culture of the Czech Republic

External links 
 Czech Republic Archives and Libraries
 Archives in the Czech Republic

 
Archives
Czech Republic
Archives